Samuel Hitchcock (March 23, 1755 – November 30, 1813) was the 1st Attorney General of Vermont, a United States district judge of the United States District Court for the District of Vermont and a United States Circuit Judge of the United States Circuit Court for the Second Circuit. He was the son-in-law of Ethan Allen and the father of Ethan A. Hitchcock.

Education and career
Born on March 23, 1755, in Brimfield, Province of Massachusetts Bay, British America, Hitchcock graduated from Harvard University in 1777. He read law with Jedediah Foster in West Brookfield, Massachusetts, attained admission to the bar, and practiced in Worcester, Massachusetts. He moved to Manchester, Republic of Vermont in 1784.

Hitchcock continued private practice in Burlington, Republic of Vermont from 1786 to 1787. He was state's attorney for Chittenden County, Republic of Vermont from 1787 to 1790. He was the 1st Attorney General of Vermont (Republic of Vermont until March 4, 1791, State of Vermont, United States on and from that date) from 1790 to 1793. He was a member of the Vermont House of Representatives (under the Republic of Vermont and State of Vermont) from 1789 to 1793. Hitchcock also served as a Justice of the Peace and heard cases in Burlington.

In 1791, Hitchcock was a delegate to the Vermont convention which ratified the United States Constitution and enabled Vermont to join the Union as the 14th state. Hitchcock drafted the charter for the University of Vermont, was an original member of its board of trustees, and was the longtime secretary of the board. In 1792, he was one of Vermont's presidential electors, casting his ballots for Washington for President and Adams for Vice President.

Federal judicial service
Hitchcock received a recess appointment from President George Washington on September 3, 1793, to a seat on the United States District Court for the District of Vermont vacated by Judge Nathaniel Chipman. He was nominated to the same position by President Washington on December 27, 1793. He was confirmed by the United States Senate on December 30, 1793, and received his commission on January 28, 1794. His service terminated on February 20, 1801, due to his elevation to the Second Circuit.

He was confirmed by the Senate on February 20, 1801, and received his commission the same day. His service terminated on July 1, 1802, due to abolition of the court.

Later career and death
Following his departure from the federal bench, Hitchcock resumed private practice in Vergennes and Burlington, Vermont from 1802 to 1813. He died in Burlington on November 30, 1813. He was buried in Burlington's Elmwood Cemetery.

Family
Hitchcock was the son of Noah and Mary Hitchcock.  He was married to Lucy Caroline Allen (1768–1842), the daughter of Ethan Allen. Their children who lived to adulthood included Lorraine Allen Hitchcock, Henry Hitchcock, Mary Anne Hitchcock, Ethan A. Hitchcock, Caroline P. Hitchcock, and Samuel Hitchcock.

Note

References

Sources

1755 births
1813 deaths
18th-century American judges
American people of English descent
Burials in Vermont
Harvard College alumni
Judges of the United States District Court for the District of Vermont
Judges of the United States circuit courts
Massachusetts lawyers
Members of the Vermont House of Representatives
Politicians from Burlington, Vermont
People from Brimfield, Massachusetts
People from Worcester, Massachusetts
State's attorneys in Vermont
United States federal judges appointed by George Washington
United States federal judges appointed by John Adams
Vermont Attorneys General
Vermont lawyers
Vermont state court judges